Founded in 1899, the Rogers Group is a Mauritius-based listed international services and investment company with expertise in five Segments: Finance & Technology, Hospitality & Travel, Logistics, Malls, and Reals Estate & Agribusiness. 

Rogers has, over the years, developed beyond Mauritius into the region and internationally, with offices in 13 countries.

Ownership 
As of June 2015, the shareholding in the stock of the company was as follows:

See also
Economy of Mauritius
List of Mauritian companies

References

Conglomerate companies of Mauritius
Financial services companies established in 1876
1876 establishments in the British Empire
Companies based in Port Louis